Hans Andrias Djurhuus (20 October 1883 – 6 May 1951) was a Faroese poet and teacher. Hans Andrias Djurhuus was one of the most productive Faroese poets. He is well known for his national poems and for his children's songs, but he also wrote psalms, short stories, plays, fairytales and one novel.

Biography
Djurhuus was born and died in Tórshavn. His brother Janus Djurhuus, who was two years older, is also one of the well-known poets of the Faroe Islands. He also had an older sister called Armgarð Maria Djurhuus, which was born in 1880. She died at a young age of 39 years old. They were born and raised in a house in the old part of Tórshavn, which is called Áarstova, down in the eastern harbour; only the brothers are often referred to as the Áarstovu Brothers (Áarstovubrøðurnir) and not their sister. 

The brother's great grandfather was Jens Christian Djurhuus (1773–1853), who was the first to write poems in the Faroese language.

After finishing school Hans Andreas worked as a fisherman for a short period, then attended folkschool (Føroya Fólkaháskúli). He then studied at the Faroese Teachers School (Føroya Læraraskúli), graduating in 1905. He worked as a school teacher in Sandavágur, Klaksvík, Tvøroyri and Tórshavn. He also edited the newspaper Dúgvan from 1909 to 1910.

Bibliography 

Ritsavn. ill. by William Heinesen. Tórshavn, 1952–1958, 7 vol. (collection of all of H.A. Djurhuus's works)

Poems 
1905: Hin gamla søgan (The Old Story)
1915: Barnarímur (children's poems). New edition published in 2000, ill. by Elinborg Lützen. 
1916: Hildarljóð
1922: Søgumál. Tórshavn: Felagið Varðin – 126 pp.
1925: Sjómansrímur. (Seamen's poems). Notes published in 1993.
1932: Halgiljóð. Tórshavn: Varðin – 52 pp.
1934: Morgun- og kvøldsálmar (Morning- and evenings psalms)
1934: Undir víðum lofti. Tórshavn: Varðin – 415 pp. (utvalgte dikt). Nytt opplag 1970
1936: Yvir teigar og tún. Tórshavn: Varðin – 345 pp. (collected poems)
1936: Havet sang

Plays 
1908: Marita
1917: Annika
1930: Álvaleikur
1930: Eitt ódnarkvøld (On a Stormy Night)
1933: Traðarbøndur 
1935: Ólavsøkumynd
1936: Løgmansdótturin á Steig
1947: Leygarkvøld í Bringsnagøtu. Published as a book, Tórshavn, Varðin, 1947 – 61 pages

Other works
1922: Eitt ár til skips ("One year on board" – short-stories and fairytales)
1922: Barnabókin (The Children's Book)
1927: Barnabókin, økt útgáva. New and changed edition 1970
1924: Føroya søga. Eitt stutt yvirlit. Tórshavn: Felagið Varðin – 59 S. (Faroese history)
1952: Føroya søga, økt útgáva. New edition published in 1963
1927: Beinta (novel, based on the legend of Beinta Broberg; this was also the basis of Jørgen-Frantz Jacobsen's novel Barbara some years later)
1929: Ævintýr (Fairytale)
1950: Í mánalýsi
1975: Fyrisagnir til skúlabrúks. – Tórshavn: Føroya skúlabókagrunnur, 39 pp. (essays for teaching in the Faroese language for children)

Djurhuus in Norwegian translation
1936 Havet song. In Norwegian translation by Peter Molaug. Gyldendal forlag

References

External links 

Faroese writers
Faroese male novelists
Faroese short story writers
Faroese children's writers
20th-century Faroese poets
Faroese songwriters
Folklore writers
Faroese-language poets
1883 births
1951 deaths
20th-century Danish novelists
Faroese male poets
20th-century Danish short story writers
Danish male short story writers
People from Tórshavn
20th-century Danish male writers